Fort Snelling National Cemetery is a United States National Cemetery located in the Fort Snelling Unorganized Territory adjacent to the historic
fort and Minneapolis–Saint Paul International Airport. It is the only National Cemetery in Minnesota. It was listed on the National Register of Historic Places in 2016.

History 
Fort Snelling was a frontier fort first established in 1819. Its original purpose was to keep the peace on what was then the western frontier. During the American Civil War it served as a recruiting camp area for Minnesota volunteers. The cemetery was officially established in 1870.

In 1937, the citizens of St. Paul, petitioned Congress to construct a National Cemetery in the area. Two years later, the new plot was dedicated, and the burials from the original post cemetery were moved to it. In 1960, the Fort Snelling Air Force Station transferred  to the cemetery; another  were acquired in 1961, expanding the cemetery to its current size.

There was a tradition of placing a flag on every grave on Memorial Day, but as the cemetery grew, the staff was forced to stop.  In 2017, the nonprofit Flags for Fort Snelling revived the tradition; volunteers placed 200,000 memorial flags in 2019.

Notable interments

Medal of Honor recipients
 Second Lieutenant Donald E. Rudolph Sr., US Army, Medal of Honor recipient for action in the Battle of Luzon in World War II
 Captain Richard E. Fleming, USMC, for action at Midway in World War II (cenotaph, body was not recovered)
 Private First Class Richard E. Kraus, USMC, for action at Peleliu in World War II
 Private First Class James D. LaBelle, USMC, for action at the Battle of Iwo Jima during World War II
 Captain Arlo Olson, US Army, for action in Italy during World War II
 Staff Sergeant Robert J. Pruden, US Army, for action in the Vietnam War
 First Lieutenant Richard Keith Sorenson, USMC, for action on Kwajalein during World War II
 Captain George H. Mallon, US Army, for actions in France during World War I
 Machinist Mate First Class Oscar F. Nelson, US Navy, for heroism aboard the USS Bennington during peacetime

Other
George John Weiss Jr Recipient of the Presidential Citizens Medal and Founder of the Fort Snelling Memorial Rifle Squad  
 Johnny Blanchard, baseball player
 Thomas Edward Burnett Jr, United Airlines Flight 93 passenger
 Bob Casey, baseball announcer
 Mark H. Gehan, Mayor of Saint Paul, Minnesota, Minnesota state representative, and lawyer, World War I
 Frank Eugene Hook, US Congressman, World War I veteran
 Dr. C. Walton Lillehei, pioneer of modern open-heart surgery
 Corporal Charles W. Lindberg, last surviving member of the Marines who flag raised the flag on Iwo Jima during World War II
 Ernest Lundeen, US Congressman
 John Mariucci, hockey coach, member of the United States Hockey Hall of Fame
 Hal Scott, sports announcer
 Bruce P. Smith, 1941 football player, Heisman Trophy winner
 David C. Sutherland III, game artist
 Major Tim Vakoc, US Army Chaplain mortally wounded in Mosul during the Iraq War
 Private Tracie McBride, rape and murder victim
 John Clay Walker, American journalist, tortured and murdered in Mexico by members of the Guadalajara Cartel
The cemetery contains one British Commonwealth war grave, of a Royal Canadian Air Force airman of World War II.

References

External links

 National Cemetery Administration
 Fort Snelling National Cemetery
 
 
 
 CWGC: Fort Snelling National Cemetery

Cemeteries in Minnesota
Historic American Landscapes Survey in Minnesota
Protected areas of Hennepin County, Minnesota
United States national cemeteries
National Register of Historic Places in Hennepin County, Minnesota
Cemeteries on the National Register of Historic Places in Minnesota
Commonwealth War Graves Commission cemeteries in the United States
1939 establishments in Minnesota